Nehru Yuva Kendras were established in the year 1972. Later in year 1987 under Rajiv Gandhi Government it became Nehru Yuva Kendra Sangathan (NYKS), an autonomous organization under Ministry of Youth Affairs and Sports, within the Government of India.

It is largest and unique grassroot level youth organisation in the world, which integrates power of the youth based on the principle of voluntarism, self-help and community participation.

Objectives 
There are two main objectives of NYKS

1:- provide rural youth avenues toward nation building

2:- provide opportunities to develop their personality and skills.

Focus 

Nehru Yuva Kendra Sangathan has been working in various fronts of youth development with a variety of youth programmes of the Ministry of Youth Affairs and certain special programmes in coordination and cooperation of other ministries. Main focus has been on developing values of good citizenship, thinking and behaving in secular ways, skill development and helping youth to adopt a productive and organized behaviour.

Vision 

 Networks of volunteership.
 Opportunities of participation in fundamental democratic practices of polity and development; and,
 Instruments of empowerment of youth like skill-generation, awareness creation about health, life skills, and self employment.

Structure

References

Ministry of Youth Affairs and Sports
Youth organisations based in India
Government schemes in India